Moustafa Mohammed Saleh (born 3 September 1963) is an Iraqi boxer. He competed in the men's bantamweight event at the 1988 Summer Olympics. He lost in the opening round of the tournament to John Lowey of Ireland.

References

External links
 

1963 births
Living people
Iraqi male boxers
Olympic boxers of Iraq
Boxers at the 1988 Summer Olympics
Place of birth missing (living people)
Bantamweight boxers